"Heaven" is a song by American singer Julia Michaels. It was written by Michaels, Taylor Parks, Brian Garcia, Uzoechi Emenike and Morten Ristorp Jensen, with production handled by Morten Ristorp. The song was released via Universal Studios and Republic Records on January 26, 2018, as the third and final single from the soundtrack to the film Fifty Shades Freed (2018).

Composition 
"Heaven" is a mid-tempo pop song that runs for three minutes and eleven seconds. Its instrumentation consists of a "syncopated synth beat", "layers of 'ooh' vocals in the background" sung by Uzoechi Emenike and Tayla Parx, and a chord progression of Gm–D/F♯–Dm–C/E-Cm/E♭-B♭-D/F♯. Written in the key of G minor, it has a tempo of 66 beats per minute with a slowly feeling in compound duple time.

Critical reception
Christina Lee of Uproxx wrote that Michaels "manages to summarize the entire Fifty Shades franchise in just two lines: 'They say all good boys go to heaven / but bad boys bring heaven to you'". Sam Damshenas of Gay Times described it as a "hauntingly addictive track" in which "Julia reminisce on a past lover". Mike Nied of Idolator regarded the song as "a sparse and sexy ode to bad boys", writing that "it offers the budding superstar an opportunity to explore a moodier aesthetic". He felt the song of being a bit risky "considering her tendency toward contemplative bops like 'Issues,' but it more than pays off". He also found the song "dangerously addictive" and opined that it is "a little more in line with the brooding material from the franchise's earlier albums". He concluded his review by calling it "a bit of a sonic switch-up" from previous materials released from the soundtrack.

Music video
The song's music video was released on February 6, 2018, and directed by Sophie Muller. In the visual, Michaels wanders around a kitchen inside an apartment, wearing a tailored suit, intercut with scenes of Michaels daydreaming half-dressed men dancing around and circle the room, and tasting ice cream from the fridge. By the end of the video, all of those men display their anger issues, echoing the "bad boys" mentioned in the song.

Live performances
Michaels made a live performance debut of the track when the she performed a medley of "Heaven" and her previous single "Issues" on The Late Show with Stephen Colbert.

Credits and personnel
Recording and management
 Mastered at Sterling Sound (New York City, New York)
 Published by Warner/Chappell Music Ltd (PRS), administered by WB Music Corp., Taylor Monet Music (BMI) & Warner-Tamerlane Publishing Corp. (BMI), HALLA! HALLA! Publishing (ASCAP) & WB Music Corp. (ASCAP), Brian Garcia Pub Designee (BMI) & Warner-Tamerlane Publishing Corp. (BMI), Thanks for the Songs Richard (BMI) & Warner-Tamerlane Publishing Corp. (BMI), Universal Pictures Music (ASCAP), UPG Music Publishing (BMI)

Personnel

Julia Michaels – vocals, songwriting
Uzoechi Emenike – songwriting, background vocals
Tayla Parx – songwriting, background vocals
Morten Ristorp Jensen – songwriting
Brian Garcia – songwriting
Morten Ristorp Jensen – production, all instruments performing
Serban Ghenea – mixing
Randy Merrill – mastering

Credits adapted from Fifty Shades Freed: Original Motion Picture Soundtrack liner notes.

Charts

Weekly charts

Year-end charts

Certifications

References

2010s ballads
2018 songs
2018 singles
Julia Michaels songs
Republic Records singles
Pop ballads
Songs written by Julia Michaels
Music videos directed by Sophie Muller
Fifty Shades film music
Songs written by Tayla Parx
Songs written by MNEK